Jaap van Lagen (born 22 December 1976 in Ede) is a Dutch racing driver, who is a former competitor in the Formula Renault 3.5 Series and a former Eurocup Megane Trophy champion. He has also raced in the World Touring Car Championship.

Racing career

World Touring Car Championship
In 2008 he raced in the World Touring Car Championship for Russian Bears Motorsport in a Lada 110. For the 2009 WTCC season he returned with full manufacturer backing from Lada. He never scored a single point. After his return to the class and Lada in 2015, he scored 16 points.

Racing record

Career summary

Complete Formula Renault 3.5 Series results
(key) (Races in bold indicate pole position) (Races in italics indicate fastest lap)

Complete World Touring Car Championship results
(key) (Races in bold indicate pole position) (Races in italics indicate fastest lap)

Complete Porsche Supercup results
(key) (Races in bold indicate pole position) (Races in italics indicate fastest lap)

‡ Van Lagen was a guest driver, therefore he was ineligible for points.
† Driver  did not finish the race, but was classified as he completed over 90% of the race distance.
⹋ No points awarded as less than 50% of race distance was completed.

24 Hours of Le Mans results

Complete TCR International Series results
(key) (Races in bold indicate pole position) (Races in italics indicate fastest lap)

Complete TCR Europe Series results
(key) (Races in bold indicate pole position) (Races in italics indicate fastest lap)

TCR Spa 500 results

References

External links 

 
 

1976 births
Living people
Dutch racing drivers
Formula Renault V6 Eurocup drivers
Formula Ford drivers
People from Ede, Netherlands
Sportspeople from Gelderland
World Series Formula V8 3.5 drivers
Eurocup Mégane Trophy drivers
24 Hours of Le Mans drivers
Porsche Supercup drivers
Superleague Formula drivers
American Le Mans Series drivers
Blancpain Endurance Series drivers
24 Hours of Spa drivers
World Touring Car Championship drivers
ADAC GT Masters drivers
24H Series drivers
MP Motorsport drivers
W Racing Team drivers
Walter Lechner Racing drivers
KTR drivers
Comtec Racing drivers
EuroInternational drivers
Van Amersfoort Racing drivers
Nürburgring 24 Hours drivers
TCR Europe Touring Car Series drivers
Porsche Carrera Cup Germany drivers